Jefferson Township is one of ten townships in Andrew County, Missouri, United States. As of the 2010 census, its population was 4,646.

Jefferson Township was established in 1846, and named after Thomas Jefferson.

Geography
It shares part of its southern border with the city of St. Joseph in neighboring Buchanan County. The township contains four cemeteries: Fairview, Green, Ladd and Vanschoiack.

The streams of Crowley Creek, Dillon Creek and Mace Creek run through this township.

References

 USGS Geographic Names Information System (GNIS)

External links
 US-Counties.com
 City-Data.com

Townships in Andrew County, Missouri
Townships in Missouri